Valley Centre is an unincorporated community in Marriott Rural Municipality 317, Saskatchewan, Canada. The community is located southeast of the Town of Biggar and northeast of the Town of Rosetown, along Highway 768.

See also 
 List of communities in Saskatchewan

Marriott No. 317, Saskatchewan
Unincorporated communities in Saskatchewan